Webwork can refer to:

 WeBWorK, a web-based homework system by the University of Rochester
 Webwork (Indian web site), a website portal accused of being a ponzi scheme
 WebWorks, a platform for BlackBerry
 A webwork plot, a type of literary form defined and practiced by Harry Stephen Keeler
 WebWork, the previous name of Apache Struts 2, an open-source web application framework

See also 
 Web worker